The 2nd Cavalry Division was a division of the regular British Army that saw service in the Peninsular War and in World War I, when it also known as Gough's Command, after its commanding general. It was part of the British Expeditionary Force that served in France in from 1914 to 1918.
It was involved in most of the major actions where cavalry were used as a mounted mobile force, and also many where the troops were dismounted and effectively served as infantry.

On 11 November 1918 units of the division were east and north-east of Mons, in Belgium. Orders were received that the division would lead the advance of Fourth Army into Germany, a move that was to begin on 17 November 1918. On 1 December it crossed the frontier south of St. Vith.  The winter was spent south of Liège, and demobilisation commenced.  The division ceased to exist on 31 March 1919.

After the war the division was reformed in the Territorial Army.

History

Napoleonic Wars
During the Peninsular War, Wellington organized his cavalry into one, later two, cavalry divisions.  They performed a purely administrative, rather than tactical, role; the normal tactical headquarters were provided by brigades commanding two, later usually three, regiments. On 19 June 1811, the cavalry was reorganized as two divisions and the existing Cavalry Division was redesignated as 1st Cavalry Division with the formation of the 2nd Cavalry Division.

Major General Sir William Erskine took command on formation. He was absent from 8 December 1811 to 8 April 1812, though at this time the division only comprised one brigade. He resumed command briefly, but committed suicide in Lisbon on 13 February 1813. The divisions were once again amalgamated as The Cavalry Division on 21 April 1813 with Lieutenant General Stapleton Cotton (of the 1st Cavalry Division) in command.

Assigned Brigades
The division was formed on 19 June 1811 with De Grey's and Long's Brigades; Long's Brigade was to remain with the division throughout its existence.  Between 8 November 1811 and 23 March 1812 it commanded just one brigade and it never exceed three brigades in strength.

First World War

Gough's Command
On 6 September, the formerly independent 5th Cavalry Brigade was joined with the 3rd Cavalry Brigade from the Cavalry Division as Gough's Command.  Named for the commander of 3rd Cavalry Brigade, Brigadier-General Hubert Gough, it took part in the First Battle of the Aisne (12–15 September).  On 13 September, the command was re-designated as the 2nd Cavalry Division, with the addition of divisional troops from the Royal Horse Artillery, Royal Engineers etc.

The 4th Cavalry Brigade joined the division on 14 October from 1st Cavalry Division to bring it up to the standard three brigade strength.  The division remained on the Western Front until the end of the war.

1914–1917
In 1914, the division took part in First Battle of Ypres, notably the battle of Gheluvelt (29–31 October).  In 1915, the division was in action at the Battle of Neuve Chapelle (10–12 March 1915) and the Second Battle of Ypres notable the Battle of St Julien (26 April–3 May) and the Battle of Bellewaarde Ridge (24–25 May).

1916 saw no notable actions, but in 1917 the division saw action in the Battle of Arras (First Battle of the Scarpe, 9–11 April). and the Battle of Cambrai (the Tank Attack of 20 and 21 November, the Capture of Bourlon Wood of 24–28 November and the German Counter-Attack of 30 November–3 December). At other times, the brigades formed dismounted units and served in the trenches as regiments under the command of their brigadiers.

War of movement
1918 saw the return of the war of movement and the division took part in the First Battle of the Somme notably the Battle of St Quentin (21–23 March), the Battle of the Lys (Battle of Hazebrouck of 14–15 April), the Battle of Amiens (8–11 August) and the Second Battle of the Somme (Battle of Albert of 21–23 August and the Second Battle of Bapaume of 31 August–3 September).

The division was then split up with the 3rd Cavalry Brigade serving with First Army, 4th Cavalry Brigade with Third Army and 5th Cavalry Brigade with Fourth Army. The brigades variously took part in the battles of the Hindenburg Line: the battles of Canal du Nord (27 September–1 October), St. Quentin Canal (29 September–2 October), Beaurevoir Line (3–5 October) and Cambrai (8–9 October) and the Pursuit to the Selle (9–12 October).  Its final action was to take part in the Advance in Picardy (17 October–11 November) including the Battle of the Sambre (4 November) and the capture of Mons (11 November, 3rd Canadian Division with 5th (Royal Irish) Lancers and one section of D Battery, RHA).

Armistice
At the Armistice, units of the division had reached Clairfayts (5th Cavalry Brigade with Fourth Army), Erquelinnes (4th Cavalry Brigade with Third Army) and Havré and St. Denis (3rd Cavalry Brigade with First Army).  On 15 November, the division was re-assembled near Maubeuge and ordered to advance into Germany as an advance screen for Fourth Army and form part of the Occupation Force. The move began on 17 November, Ciney and Rochefort were reached five days later and the 5th Cavalry Brigade crossed the German border south of St. Vith on 1 December.

In late December, the division moved to winter quarters south and south-east of Liège.  It remained here until 30 January 1919 when it exchanged regiments with 1st and 3rd Cavalry Divisions then gradually moved back to England.  The Division ceased to exist at midnight 31 March / 1 April 1919.

Order of battle

3rd Cavalry Brigade

The brigade joined Gough's Command on 6 September from The Cavalry Division and remained with the division until the end of the war.

4th Cavalry Brigade

The brigade joined the division on 14 October from 1st Cavalry Division and remained with the division until the end of the war.

5th Cavalry Brigade

The brigade, formerly independent, joined Gough's Command on 6 September and remained with the division until the end of the war.

Divisional Artillery
III Brigade, Royal Horse Artillery
D Battery, Royal Horse Artillery attached to 3rd Cavalry Brigade
E Battery, Royal Horse Artillery attached to 5th Cavalry Brigade
J Battery, Royal Horse Artillery attached to 4th Cavalry Brigade
1/1st Warwickshire Battery, RHA (TF)
III Brigade Ammunition Column

Divisional Troops
The division was supported by the following units:

Territorial Army
In the 1920s the division was reformed from Yeomanry regiments in the Territorial Army with the following organisation:
 5th Cavalry Brigade
 Yorkshire Hussars (Alexandra, Princess of Wales's Own)
 Yorkshire Dragoons (Queen's Own)
 Nottinghamshire Yeomanry (Sherwood Rangers)

 6th Cavalry Brigade
 Warwickshire Yeomanry
 Staffordshire Yeomanry (Queen's Own Royal Regiment)
 Leicestershire Yeomanry (Prince Albert's Own)

 Royal Artillery
 11th (Honourable Artillery Company and City of London Yeomanry) Brigade, Royal Horse Artillery
 A & B HAC Batteries
 No 1 City of London (Yeomanry) Battery

 Royal Engineers
 2nd Cavalry Divisional Royal Engineers
 2nd (Cheshire) Field Squadron

 Royal Corps of Signals
 2nd Cavalry Divisional Signals (Middlesex Yeomanry)
 A & B (Middlesex Yeomanry) Squadrons

 Royal Army Service Corps
 2nd Cavalry Divisional Train
 No 529 (Cheshire) Cavalry (Horse Transport) Company
 No 530 (Cheshire) Cavalry (Mechanical Transport) Company

 Royal Army Medical Corps
 170th Cavalry Field Ambulance

 Royal Army Ordnance Corps
 2nd Cavalry Divisional Detachment

On the outbreak of World War II 2nd Cavalry Division's units were reorganised as 1st Cavalry Division and served in Palestine, Iraq and Syria before being converted into 10th Armoured Division on 1 August 1941.

Commanders
The 2nd Cavalry Division had the following commanders:

See also

List of British divisions in World War I
British Army during World War I
British Cavalry Corps order of battle 1914
British cavalry during the First World War

Notes

References

Citations

Bibliography
 
 
 
 
 
 
 Titles and Designations of Formations and Units of the Territorial Army, London: War Office, 7 November 1927.

External links
 

2
2
Military units and formations established in 1914
Military units and formations disestablished in 1919
1914 establishments in the United Kingdom